John King (birth year unknown) is a former professional rugby league footballer who played in the 1940s. He played at club level for the Featherstone Rovers (Heritage № 282).

Club career
John King made his début for the Featherstone Rovers on Saturday 24 January 1948, he appears to have scored no drop-goals (or field-goals as they are currently known in Australasia), but prior to the 1974–75 season all goals, whether; conversions, penalties, or drop-goals, scored 2-points, consequently prior to this date drop-goals were often not explicitly documented, therefore '0' drop-goals may indicate drop-goals not recorded, rather than no drop-goals scored. In addition, prior to the 1949–50 season, the archaic field-goal was also still a valid means of scoring points.

References

External links
Search for "King" at rugbyleagueproject.org

English rugby league players
Featherstone Rovers players
Place of birth missing (living people)
Possibly living people
Year of birth missing (living people)